Bhuma Akhila Priya is an Indian politician from Andhra Pradesh. She is the former Tourism and Culture minister of Andhra Pradesh. She is currently the member of Telugu Desam Party.

Early life 
Akhila Priya was born on 2 April 1987  to Bhuma Nagi Reddy and Shobha Nagi Reddy in Allagadda, Kurnool District, Andhra Pradesh. She is the eldest of three children. In 2014 had to contest in the Allagadda by-election which was vacant due to the death of her mother in a road accident, was unanimously elected representing the YSR Congress Party.

Political career 
In 2014, she won as an Member of the Legislative Assembly from the Allagadda assembly constituency by-election representing YSR Congress Party.

Later in 2016, she joined Telugu Desam Party along with her father Bhuma Nagi Reddy and served as the Minister for Tourism, Telugu Language and Culture under the Telugu Desam Party government. In 2019 she contested from Allagadda assembly constituency from Telugu Desam Party and lost the election to Gangula Bijendra Reddy of YSR Congress Party.

Personal life 
In 2018, she married industrialist Bharghava Ram.

References 

Telugu Desam Party politicians
Indian politicians
Living people
1987 births